Shuihui Garden is a park in the northeast of Rugao, Jiangsu, China, and was first built during the Ming dynasty by Mao Yiguan. It was finished in the Qing dynasty by Mao Pijiang, who was Mao Yiguan's great-grandson. Shuihui Garden has been rebuilt and today is known as former residence of Mao Pijiang and Dong Xiaowan.

Shuihui Garden is a glistening pearl in the northern part of Jiangsu province. It is famous for water flowing around the whole garden. The atmosphere here is elegant and literary. It is said that Mao Pijiang and Dong Xiaowan used to read poems and discuss some interesting topics here.

Shuihiu Garden  lies in the north east of Rugao. The name, Shuihui Garden, means clear water.

Attractions
Shuihui Garden was designed by using Mao design guidelines. For example, he took advantages of rivers to make the whole garden which was surrounded by water look like an ink picture.
Several stone bridges
 Xiao San Wu Ting
Bo Yan Yu, Han Bi Tang
Huan Lei Feng
Yi Mo Zhai
Shui Ming Building.

References

Gardens in China
Tourist attractions in Nantong
Gardens in Jiangsu
Major National Historical and Cultural Sites in Jiangsu